The moths of Zambia represent about 465 known moth species. The moths (mostly nocturnal) and butterflies (mostly diurnal) together make up the taxonomic order Lepidoptera.

This is a list of moth species which have been recorded in Zambia.

Arctiidae
Acantharctia atriramosa Hampson, 1907
Alpenus dollmani (Hampson, 1920)
Alpenus intacta (Hampson, 1916)
Alpenus maculosa (Stoll, 1781)
Amata chariessa (Jordan, 1936)
Amata croceizona (Hampson, 1910)
Amata miozona (Hampson, 1910)
Amerila bubo (Walker, 1855)
Amerila lupia (Druce, 1887)
Amsacta aureolimbata Rothschild, 1910
Amsacta grammiphlebia Hampson, 1901
Anaphosia eurygrapha Hampson, 1910
Balacra elegans Aurivillius, 1892
Balacra rubrostriata (Aurivillius, 1892)
Bergeria haematochrysa Kiriakoff, 1952
Binna scita (Walker, 1865)
Creatonotos leucanioides Holland, 1893
Creatonotos punctivitta (Walker, 1854)
Eilema elegans (Butler, 1877)
Eilema heterogyna (Hampson, 1910)
Estigmene ansorgei Rothschild, 1910
Estigmene neuriastis Hampson, 1907
Estigmene sabulosa Romieux, 1943
Estigmene trivitta (Walker, 1855)
Eyralpenus diplosticta (Hampson, 1900)
Eyralpenus meinhofi (Bartel, 1903)
Eyralpenus metaxantha (Hampson, 1920)
Eyralpenus scioana (Oberthür, 1880)
Mecistorhabdia haematoessa (Holland, 1893)
Metarctia lateritia Herrich-Schäffer, 1855
Metarctia robusta (Kiriakoff, 1973)
Micralarctia punctulatum (Wallengren, 1860)
Nyctemera itokina (Aurivillius, 1904)
Paralpenus flavicosta (Hampson, 1909)
Paramelisa dollmani Hampson, 1920
Pseudlepista atrizona Hampson, 1910
Secusio atrizonata Hampson, 1910
Spilosoma latiradiata (Hampson, 1901)
Spilosoma lentifasciata (Hampson, 1916)
Spilosoma lineata Walker, 1855
Teracotona rhodophaea (Walker, 1865)
Utetheisa pulchella (Linnaeus, 1758)

Brahmaeidae
Dactyloceras lucina (Drury, 1872)

Cossidae
Phragmataecia irrorata Hampson, 1910

Crambidae
Agathodes musivalis Guenée, 1854
Classeya quadricuspis (Hampson, 1919)
Crocidophora caffralis Hampson, 1910
Euclasta varii Popescu-Gorj & Constantinescu, 1973
Nomophila brevispinalis Munroe, 1973
Pilocrocis dichocrosialis Hampson, 1912

Drepanidae
Gonoreta forcipulata Watson, 1965
Negera natalensis (Felder, 1874)

Eupterotidae
Epijana cosima (Plötz, 1880)
Hibrildes crawshayi Butler, 1896
Jana eurymas Herrich-Schäffer, 1854
Phiala aurivillii (Bethune-Baker, 1915)

Gelechiidae
Anarsia agricola Walsingham, 1891

Geometridae
Cacostegania australis Warren, 1901
Cacostegania confusa (Warren, 1901)
Chiasmia ammodes (Prout, 1922)
Chiasmia crassata (Warren, 1897)
Chiasmia curvifascia (Warren, 1897)
Chiasmia kilimanjarensis (Holland, 1892)
Chiasmia procidata (Guenée, 1858)
Chlorissa albistrigulata (Warren, 1897)
Chrysocraspeda apseogramma (Prout, 1932)
Chrysocraspeda dollmani (Prout, 1932)
Chrysocraspeda subminiosa (Prout, 1932)
Cleora rostella D. S. Fletcher, 1967
Collesis mimica Warren, 1897
Cyclophora inaequalis (Warren, 1902)
Discomiosis crescentifera (Warren, 1902)
Epigynopteryx flavedinaria (Guenée, 1857)
Erastria leucicolor (Butler, 1875)
Erastria madecassaria (Boisduval, 1833)
Idaea auriflua (Warren, 1902)
Oaracta maculata (Warren, 1897)
Omizodes rubrifasciata (Butler, 1896)
Omphalucha brunnea (Warren, 1899)
Orbamia octomaculata (Wallengren, 1872)
Orbamia subaurata (Warren, 1899)
Scopula argentidisca (Warren, 1902)
Scopula concurrens (Warren, 1897)
Scopula curvimargo (Warren, 1900)
Scopula natalica (Butler, 1875)
Syncollesis tiviae Prout, 1934
Traminda neptunaria (Guenée, 1858)
Zamarada acosmeta Prout, 1921
Zamarada aequilumata D. S. Fletcher, 1974
Zamarada arguta D. S. Fletcher, 1974
Zamarada bathyscaphes Prout, 1912
Zamarada crystallophana Mabille, 1900
Zamarada deceptrix Warren, 1914
Zamarada denticatella Prout, 1922
Zamarada differens Bastelberger, 1907
Zamarada dorsiplaga Prout, 1922
Zamarada excavata Bethune-Baker, 1913
Zamarada flavicaput Warren, 1901
Zamarada gamma D. S. Fletcher, 1958
Zamarada glareosa Bastelberger, 1909
Zamarada gracilata D. S. Fletcher, 1974
Zamarada ignicosta Prout, 1912
Zamarada janata D. S. Fletcher, 1974
Zamarada labifera Prout, 1915
Zamarada metrioscaphes Prout, 1912
Zamarada plana Bastelberger, 1909
Zamarada polyctemon Prout, 1932
Zamarada psi D. S. Fletcher, 1974
Zamarada purimargo Prout, 1912
Zamarada rubrifascia Pinhey, 1962
Zamarada rufilinearia Swinhoe, 1904
Zamarada scintillans Bastelberger, 1909
Zamarada seydeli D. S. Fletcher, 1974
Zamarada unisona D. S. Fletcher, 1974
Zamarada varii D. S. Fletcher, 1974

Gracillariidae
Aristaea onychota (Meyrick, 1908)

Himantopteridae
Pedoptila nigrocristata Joicey & Talbot, 1921

Lasiocampidae
Bombycopsis venosa (Butler, 1895)
Catalebeda jamesoni (Bethune-Baker, 1908)
Chrysopsyche pyriphlecta Tams, 1930
Chrysopsyche pyrodes Tams, 1931
Dollmania plinthochroa Tams, 1930
Epitrabala nyassana (Aurivillius, 1909)
Eutricha morosa (Walker, 1865)
Euwallengrenia reducta (Walker, 1855)
Filiola lanceolata (Hering, 1932)
Gonometa griseocincta Hampson, 1910
Grammodora nigrolineata (Aurivillius, 1895)
Grellada marshalli (Aurivillius, 1902)
Mallocampa cornutiventris Tams, 1929
Mallocampa dollmani (Tams, 1925)
Metajana hypolispa Tams, 1930
Pachymeta immunda (Holland, 1893)
Pachymetana horridula (Tams, 1925)
Pallastica pallens (Bethune-Baker, 1908)
Philotherma clara Bethune-Baker, 1908
Pseudometa canescens Tams, 1925
Pseudometa choba (Druce, 1899)
Pseudometa dollmani Tams, 1925
Sonitha lila Zolotuhin & Prozorov, 2010
Stenophatna cymographa (Hampson, 1910)
Stenophatna marshalli Aurivillius, 1909
Stenophatna rothschildi (Tams, 1936)
Stenophatna tamsi (Kiriakoff, 1963)
Stoermeriana graberi (Dewitz, 1881)
Stoermeriana sjostedti (Aurivillius, 1902)
Stoermeriana tessmanni (Strand, 1912)
Streblote rufaria (Bethune-Baker, 1908)
Theophasida superba (Aurivillius, 1914)
Trabala charon Druce, 1910

Lemoniidae
Sabalia barnsi Prout, 1918
Sabalia picarina Walker, 1865

Limacodidae
Chrysopoloma variegata Hering, 1937
Hadraphe ethiopica (Bethune-Baker, 1915)
Latoiola viridifusca (Pinhey, 1968)
Niphadolepis griseicostalis West, 1940
Oidemaskelis eurota Bethune-Baker, 1915
Omocena dollmani West, 1940
Thosea cataractae West, 1937

Lymantriidae
Barlowia pyrilampes Collenette, 1931
Crorema cartera Collenette, 1939
Euproctis aethiopica (Bethune-Baker, 1908)
Euproctis apatela (Tams, 1930)
Homochira rendalli (Distant, 1897)
Hyaloperina nudiuscula Aurivillius, 1904
Laelia marginepunctata Bethune-Baker, 1908
Rhodesana crenulata Bethune-Baker, 1908
Tamsita ochthoeba (Hampson, 1920)

Metarbelidae
Arbelodes claudiae Lehmann, 2010
Arbelodes prochesi Lehmann, 2010
Mountelgonia abercornensis Lehmann, 2013

Noctuidae
Achaea catella Guenée, 1852
Achaea dasybasis Hampson, 1913
Acontia atrisignata Hampson, 1918
Acontia aurelia Hacker, Legrain & Fibiger, 2008
Acontia niphogona (Hampson, 1909)
Acontia submutata Hacker, Legrain & Fibiger, 2008
Acontia wahlbergi Wallengren, 1856
Agoma trimenii (Felder, 1874)
Amyna ruptirena Hampson, 1910
Andrhippuris caudaequina Karsch, 1895
Asota speciosa (Drury, 1773)
Aspidifrontia corticea (Hampson, 1910)
Athetis camptogramma (Hampson, 1910)
Attatha ethiopica Hampson, 1910
Audea humeralis Hampson, 1902
Carpostalagma signata Talbot, 1932
Chrysodeixis acuta (Walker, [1858])
Cirrodes phoenicea Hampson, 1910
Colpocheilopteryx operatrix (Wallengren, 1860)
Corgatha hypoxantha Hampson, 1910
Cortyta polycyma (Hampson, 1909)
Crameria amabilis (Drury, 1773)
Ctenusa pallida (Hampson, 1902)
Cyligramma amblyops Mabille, 1891
Cyligramma latona (Cramer, 1775)
Deinopa flavida Hampson, 1926
Digama aganais (Felder, 1874)
Dysgonia erectata (Hampson, 1902)
Dysgonia macrorhyncha (Hampson, 1913)
Dysgonia mesonephele (Hampson, 1910)
Dysgonia porphyrescens (Hampson, 1910)
Dysgonia proxima (Hampson, 1902)
Dysgonia torrida (Guenée, 1852)
Entomogramma pardus Guenée, 1852
Erebus walkeri (Butler, 1875)
Ethioterpia neavi Hampson, 1910
Eublemma trigramma Hampson, 1910
Eudrapa grisea Pinhey, 1968
Eulocastra aethiops (Distant, 1898)
Eustrotia foedalis (Walker, 1866)
Eustrotia perirrorata Hampson, 1918
Eutelia symphonica Hampson, 1902
Grammodes geometrica (Fabricius, 1775)
Grammodes microgonia (Hampson, 1910)
Heliophisma xanthoptera (Hampson, 1910)
Heraclia aemulatrix (Westwood, 1881)
Heraclia atriventralis (Hampson, 1910)
Heraclia flavipennis (Bartel, 1903)
Heraclia limbomaculata (Strand, 1909)
Heraclia monslunensis (Hampson, 1901)
Hespagarista caudata (Dewitz, 1879)
Hespagarista eburnea Jordan, 1915
Hoplarista haemaplaga Hampson, 1910
Hypopyra capensis Herrich-Schäffer, 1854
Lepidodelta phoenicraspis (Hampson, 1910)
Leucovis alba (Rothschild, 1897)
Lophoptera litigiosa (Boisduval, 1833)
Masalia albipuncta (Hampson, 1910)
Masalia flavistrigata (Hampson, 1903)
Masalia galatheae (Wallengren, 1856)
Masalia sublimis (Berio, 1962)
Masalia transvaalica (Distant, 1902)
Mimasura innotata Hampson, 1910
Mimasura quadripuncta Hampson, 1910
Mitrophrys gynandra Jordan, 1913
Mocis frugalis (Fabricius, 1775)
Mocis mayeri (Boisduval, 1833)
Mocis mutuaria (Walker, 1858)
Mocis persinuosa (Hampson, 1910)
Ochropleura leucogaster (Freyer, 1831)
Ophisma albitermia (Hampson, 1910)
Ophiusa david (Holland, 1894)
Ophiusa gonoptera Hampson, 1910
Ophiusa obsolescens (Hampson, 1918)
Ophiusa tettensis (Hopffer, 1857)
Ophiusa tumiditermina Hampson, 1910
Oraesia wintgensi (Strand, 1909)
Ozarba apicalis Hampson, 1910
Ozarba hemimelaena Hampson, 1910
Ozarba subterminalis Hampson, 1910
Parachalciope albifissa (Hampson, 1910)
Parachalciope benitensis (Holland, 1894)
Parachalciope deltifera (Felder & Rogenhofer, 1874)
Parachalciope mahura (Felder & Rogenhofer, 1874)
Phaegorista similis Walker, 1869
Phaegorista xanthosoma Hampson, 1910
Phytometra hypopsamma (Hampson, 1926)
Plecopterodes griseicilia (Hampson, 1910)
Plecopterodes heterochroa (Hampson, 1910)
Plecopterodes melliflua (Holland, 1897)
Plecopterodes molybdopasta (Hampson, 1910)
Pseudospiris paidiformis Butler, 1895
Rhanidophora odontophora Hampson, 1926
Rhynchina leucodonta Hampson, 1910
Thyas parallelipipeda (Guenée, 1852)
Thyatirina achatina (Weymer, 1896)
Thysanoplusia cupreomicans (Hampson, 1909)

Nolidae
Aiteta thermistis (Hampson, 1910)
Arcyophora endoglauca (Hampson, 1910)
Chlorozada metaleuca (Hampson, 1905)
Neaxestis irrorata (Hampson, 1910)
Neaxestis piperitella (Strand, 1909)
Negeta albigrisea (Hampson, 1910)
Negeta lacteata (Hampson, 1910)
Nola foviferoides Poole, 1989
Odontestis fuscicona (Hampson, 1910)
Odontestis striata Hampson, 1912
Westermannia oediplaga Hampson, 1910

Notodontidae
Antizana sparsata Gaede, 1928
Crestonica pinheyi Kiriakoff, 1968
Deinarchia agramma (Hampson, 1910)
Epicerura pergrisea (Hampson, 1910)
Hampsonita esmeralda (Hampson, 1910)
Heraia thalassina (Hampson, 1910)
Iridoplitis iridescens Kiriakoff, 1955
Janthinisca rosita Kiriakoff, 1968
Paradrallia rhodesi Bethune-Baker, 1908
Polelassothys callista Tams, 1930
Polienus marginestriatus Kiriakoff, 1975
Quista cinereomixta Kiriakoff, 1959
Scalmicauda auribasis Kiriakoff, 1975
Scranciola multilineata (Gaede, 1928)
Stauropida griseola Kiriakoff, 1962
Synete vaumaculata Kiriakoff, 1962
Trotonotus subapicalis Gaede, 1928

Psychidae
Eumeta cervina Druce, 1887

Pterophoridae
Lantanophaga pusillidactylus (Walker, 1864)

Pyralidae
Aphomia argentia Whalley, 1964
Hypsopygia mauritialis (Boisduval, 1833)

Saturniidae
Adafroptilum incana (Sonthonnax, 1899)
Antistathmoptera daltonae Tams, 1935
Argema kuhnei Pinhey, 1969
Athletes gigas (Sonthonnax, 1902)
Athletes semialba (Sonthonnax, 1904)
Aurivillius seydeli Rougeot, 1962
Bunaeopsis angolana (Le Cerf, 1918)
Bunaeopsis hersilia (Westwood, 1849)
Bunaeopsis jacksoni (Jordan, 1908)
Bunaeopsis licharbas (Maassen & Weymer, 1885)
Bunaeopsis oubie (Guérin-Méneville, 1849)
Bunaeopsis phidias (Weymer, 1909)
Bunaeopsis saffronica Pinhey, 1972
Campimoptilum kuntzei (Dewitz, 1881)
Cinabra hyperbius (Westwood, 1881)
Cirina forda (Westwood, 1849)
Decachorda bouvieri Hering, 1929
Decachorda pomona (Weymer, 1892)
Decachorda rosea Aurivillius, 1898
Epiphora antinorii (Oberthür, 1880)
Epiphora bauhiniae (Guérin-Méneville, 1832)
Epiphora mythimnia (Westwood, 1849)
Epiphora rectifascia Rothschild, 1907
Gonimbrasia desena Vinciguerra, 2009
Gonimbrasia rectilineata (Sonthonnax, 1899)
Gonimbrasia tyrrhea (Cramer, 1775)
Gonimbrasia zambesina (Walker, 1865)
Gynanisa albescens Sonthonnax, 1904
Gynanisa ata Strand, 1911
Gynanisa maja (Klug, 1836)
Heniocha apollonia (Cramer, 1779)
Heniocha marnois (Rogenhofer, 1891)
Holocerina agomensis (Karsch, 1896)
Holocerina angulata (Aurivillius, 1893)
Holocerina smilax (Westwood, 1849)
Imbrasia ertli Rebel, 1904
Lobobunaea angasana (Westwood, 1849)
Lobobunaea phaedusa (Drury, 1782)
Lobobunaea rosea (Sonthonnax, 1899)
Ludia orinoptena Karsch, 1892
Melanocera parva Rothschild, 1907
Melanocera sufferti (Weymer, 1896)
Micragone ansorgei (Rothschild, 1907)
Micragone cana (Aurivillius, 1893)
Micragone lichenodes (Holland, 1893)
Micragone nubifera Bouvier, 1936
Nudaurelia alopia Westwood, 1849
Nudaurelia carnegiei Janse, 1918
Nudaurelia dione (Fabricius, 1793)
Nudaurelia gueinzii (Staudinger, 1872)
Nudaurelia macrops Rebel, 1917
Nudaurelia macrothyris (Rothschild, 1906)
Orthogonioptilum adiegetum Karsch, 1892
Pseudantheraea imperator Rougeot, 1962
Pseudaphelia apollinaris (Boisduval, 1847)
Pseudimbrasia deyrollei (J. Thomson, 1858)
Pseudobunaea callista (Jordan, 1910)
Pseudobunaea heyeri (Weymer, 1896)
Pseudobunaea irius (Fabricius, 1793)
Pseudobunaea tyrrhena (Westwood, 1849)
Rohaniella pygmaea (Maassen & Weymer, 1885)
Tagoropsis hanningtoni (Butler, 1883)
Ubaena dolabella (Druce, 1886)
Ubaena fuelleborniana Karsch, 1900
Usta terpsichore (Maassen & Weymer, 1885)

Sesiidae
Chamanthedon chrysopasta Hampson, 1919
Homogyna sanguicosta Hampson, 1919
Homogyna spadicicorpus Prout, 1919
Lepidopoda pictipes Hampson, 1919
Megalosphecia callosoma Hampson, 1919
Melittia aureosquamata (Wallengren, 1863)
Melittia chrysobapta Hampson, 1919
Melittia natalensis Butler, 1874
Melittia oedipus Oberthür, 1878
Paranthrene chalcochlora Hampson, 1919
Paranthrene propyria Hampson, 1919
Synanthedon cyanescens (Hampson, 1910)
Synanthedon flavipalpis (Hampson, 1910)
Thyranthrene obliquizona (Hampson, 1910)

Sphingidae
Acanthosphinx guessfeldti (Dewitz, 1879)
Afroclanis calcareus (Rothschild & Jordan, 1907)
Afrosphinx amabilis (Jordan, 1911)
Andriasa mitchelli Hayes, 1973
Antinephele lunulata Rothschild & Jordan, 1903
Basiothia aureata (Karsch, 1891)
Chaerocina dohertyi Rothschild & Jordan, 1903
Dovania poecila Rothschild & Jordan, 1903
Euchloron megaera (Linnaeus, 1758)
Hippotion roseipennis (Butler, 1882)
Hippotion stigma (Rothschild & Jordan, 1903)
Leptoclanis pulchra Rothschild & Jordan, 1903
Leucophlebia afra Karsch, 1891
Likoma apicalis Rothschild & Jordan, 1903
Neoclanis basalis (Walker, 1866)
Neopolyptychus convexus (Rothschild & Jordan, 1903)
Nephele lannini Jordan, 1926
Nephele rosae Butler, 1875
Pantophaea oneili (Clark, 1925)
Phylloxiphia formosa (Schultze, 1914)
Phylloxiphia metria (Jordan, 1920)
Phylloxiphia punctum (Rothschild, 1907)
Phylloxiphia vicina (Rothschild & Jordan, 1915)
Polyptychoides grayii (Walker, 1856)
Polyptychoides niloticus (Jordan, 1921)
Polyptychus baxteri Rothschild & Jordan, 1908
Polyptychus coryndoni Rothschild & Jordan, 1903
Polyptychus hollandi Rothschild & Jordan, 1903
Polyptychus murinus Rothschild, 1904
Praedora marshalli Rothschild & Jordan, 1903
Praedora plagiata Rothschild & Jordan, 1903
Rhodafra marshalli Rothschild & Jordan, 1903
Rufoclanis numosae (Wallengren, 1860)
Sphingonaepiopsis ansorgei Rothschild, 1904
Temnora albilinea Rothschild, 1904
Temnora burdoni Carcasson, 1968
Temnora elegans (Rothschild, 1895)
Temnora funebris (Holland, 1893)
Temnora griseata Rothschild & Jordan, 1903
Temnora iapygoides (Holland, 1889)
Temnora livida (Holland, 1889)
Temnora natalis Walker, 1856
Temnora pylades Rothschild & Jordan, 1903
Temnora scitula (Holland, 1889)
Temnora spiritus (Holland, 1893)
Theretra capensis (Linnaeus, 1764)

Thyrididae
Arniocera chalcopasta Hampson, 1910
Arniocera cyanoxantha (Mabille, 1893)
Bupota tranquilla Whalley, 1971
Dilophura caudata (Jordan, 1907)
Dysodia constellata Warren, 1908
Dysodia crassa (Walker, 1865)
Dysodia intermedia (Walker, 1865)
Kalenga culanota Whalley, 1971
Kalenga maculanota Whalley, 1971
Netrocera hemichrysa (Hampson, 1910)

Tineidae
Acridotarsa melipecta (Meyrick, 1915)
Ceratophaga ethadopa (Meyrick, 1938)
Ceratophaga lichmodes (Meyrick, 1921)
Ceratophaga vastellus (Zeller, 1852)
Cimitra texturata (Gozmány, 1967)
Criticonoma crassa Gozmány & Vári, 1973
Criticonoma episcardina (Gozmány, 1965)
Cubitofusa pseudoglebata (Gozmány, 1967)
Cubitofusa seydeli (Gozmány, 1967)
Drosica abjectella Walker, 1963
Hapsifera glebata Meyrick, 1908
Hapsifera marmarota Meyrick, 1914
Hapsifera septica Meyrick, 1908
Hyperbola hesperis Gozmány, 1967
Hyperbola homogena Gozmány, 1967
Hyperbola moschias (Meyrick, 1914)
Hyperbola phocina (Meyrick, 1908)
Monopis megalodelta Meyrick, 1908
Monopis rejectella (Walker, 1864)
Morophaga soror Gozmány, 1965
Organodesma erinacea (Walker, 1863)
Organodesma onomasta Gozmány & Vári, 1975
Organodesma petaloxantha (Meyrick, 1931)
Paraptica concinerata Meyrick, 1917
Perissomastix fulvicoma (Meyrick, 1921)
Perissomastix titanea Gozmány, 1967
Pitharcha atrisecta (Meyrick, 1918)
Pitharcha chalinaea Meyrick, 1908
Sphallestasis oenopis (Meyrick, 1908)
Tinea subalbidella Stainton, 1867

Tortricidae
Cornesia ormoperla Razowski, 1981
Eccopsis incultana (Walker, 1863)

Zygaenidae
Astyloneura trefurthi Gaede, 1914
Syringura triplex (Plötz, 1880)

References

External links 

Moths
Moths
Zambia
Zambia